"Don't Try" is a song from British indie pop band Everything Everything. The track was released in the United Kingdom on 16 June 2013 as the fourth single from the band's second studio album, Arc (2013). The single's B-side is a live recording from the Maida Vale Studios of The Korgis' "Everybody's Got to Learn Sometime". The recording comes from 17 October 2012, where the band covered the track for BBC Radio 1 DJ Zane Lowe.

Track listing

Credits and personnel
Recording and mixing
Recorded at RAK Studios, London; Angelic Studios, Halse; Muttley Ranch, London; Jonathan's Flat, Manchester; The Garden, London; Crotch Int. Studios, Gilsland mixed at Muttley Ranch, London.

Personnel

Songwriting - Jonathan Higgs
Production - David Kosten, Everything Everything
Recording - Mo Hauseler, Tom A.D. Fuller, David Kosten
Assistant Engineering - Mike Horner, Pete Prokopiw
Mixing - David Kosten
Mastering - John Davis (at Metropolis Mastering)
Instrumentation - Jonathan Higgs, Jeremy Pritchard, Alex Robertshaw, Michael Spearman

Credits adapted from the liner notes of Arc, RCA Records, UMP.

Release history

References

2013 singles
Everything Everything songs
2013 songs
RCA Records singles
Songs written by Jonathan Higgs